Hong Jin-kyung (born December 23, 1977) is a South Korean entrepreneur, model, host, comedian and actress. She featured in the television series My Love from the Star (2013), The Legend of the Blue Sea (2016), and starred in the variety show Off to School (2014). She first became known due to her modelling career including global brand like Benetton in 90's.

From 2016 to 2017, she was a cast member of KBS2's Sister's Slam Dunk.

Philanthropy 
On March 31, 2022, Hong made a donation  millions to Hope Pebble to help the underprivileged children in difficult situations in Korea by donating with Monami.

Filmography

Film

Variety/reality shows

Web shows

Television series

Awards and nominations

References

External links
Instagram 

1977 births
Living people
South Korean female models
South Korean women comedians
South Korean television actresses
South Korean television presenters
South Korean female idols
South Korean women television presenters
South Korean radio presenters
South Korean women in business
People from Seoul
Dongguk University alumni
21st-century South Korean actresses
21st-century South Korean businesspeople
21st-century businesswomen
South Korean women radio presenters
Models from Seoul